Heteropodagrion croizati is a species of damselfly in the family Thaumatoneuridae.

The IUCN conservation status of Heteropodagrion croizati is "LC", least concern, with no immediate threat to the species' survival. The IUCN status was reviewed in 2016.

References

Further reading

 

Calopterygoidea
Articles created by Qbugbot
Insects described in 2011